Harish Khanna may refer to:

Harish Khanna (politician) is an Indian politician belonging to Aam Admi Party.
Harish Khanna (actor) Harish Khanna is an Indian actor and theatre personality who appears mainly in Indian and foreign language films.